This article is about the automotive industry in Mexico.

History

Early years (1903–1960)
In 1903,  motorcars first arrived in Mexico City, totalling 136 cars in that year and rising to 800 by 1906. This encouraged then president Porfirio Díaz, to create both the first Mexican highway code (which would allow cars to move at a maximum speed of 10 km/h or 6 mph on crowded or small streets and 40 km/h or 25 mph elsewhere) and, along with this, a tax for car owners which would be abolished in 1911 with Francisco I. Madero's successful campaign against Díaz's presidency at the outbreak of the Mexican Revolution. In 1910, Daimler and Renault both established small facilities for the local assembly of vehicles primarily for the Mexican government at the behest of Porfirio Díaz, but these functioned for little more than a few months before being destroyed in the Mexican Revolution. A short time after the end of the armed struggle, Buick became the first automobile producer to be officially established in Mexico, beginning in 1921. In 1925, Ford Motor Company was established and began manufacturing vehicles in the country, and, as of 2020, remains the longest-running brand in the country. In 1961, Mexico produced its first fully domestic vehicle, a small truck called the Rural Ramírez, produced by the Ramirez truck company.

Decline (1961–1993)
Many car makers were already operational by 1961 when the first decline of the Mexican economy showed up. In the early 1960s, government regulations forced car companies to assemble cars in Mexico, using local as well as imported components. The idea was to develop a national car industry in the country, to promote employment and technological advances. Those companies that would not comply with these regulations left the country; these included Mercedes Benz, FIAT, Citroën, Peugeot and Volvo. The American Big Three (General Motors, Ford and Chrysler) remained along with American Motors, Renault, Volkswagen, Datsun and Borgward.

In this same year, due to the announcement of the upcoming 1968 Summer Olympics to be held in Mexico, the Government reissued Diaz's car ownership tax, purportedly to afford the construction of new facilities for such an event; this was named the Tenencia Vehicular (from the verb tener; "to have" in Spanish). However, the tax remained to finance the 1970 FIFA World Cup, also held in Mexico. Ironically, the tax remains today in most states, and it must be paid year after year.
This tax is variable depending on the car's value, number of cylinders, type of transmission, air conditioning and further features, adding up to a payment of up to 10% of the car's total value.

A second tax exists as well when purchasing a new vehicle called Impuesto sobre Automóviles Nuevos or ISAN ("Tax on new cars"), also depending on a vehicle's specifications and cost. Unlike the Tenencia, this tax is paid only once. Federal law requires all listed car prices in media or dealerships to have the standard 16% VAT tax and ISAN included in the listed price.

Since many Mexican drivers default on paying this tax, the Government started taking countermeasures. However, due to this being perceived as uncontrollable, politicians started making proposals to abolish this tax, remarkably Felipe Calderón.
Tenencia has, as of 2011, only been abolished in Querétaro. On 4 March 2011, President Calderón announced Tenencia will be completely abolished by 2012 in all states, but not in the Federal District which comprises most of Mexico City.

Rebirth (1994–2006)
The growth of Mexico's economy during the late '90s stimulated car sales in Mexico and, eventually, most of the retired carmakers re-established themselves in the country. Makers such as Honda and Porsche arrived for the first time during the last years of the 20th Century, and others such as Peugeot and Mercedes-Benz gave Mexico a "second chance", both re-establishing in 1997.

Annual passenger vehicle sales in Mexico reached the one million milestone in 2005. The increasing sales figures encouraged carmakers to offer cars with alternative fuels like the Honda Civic Hybrid and the Volkswagen Jetta TDI. Such cars hadn't been available in Mexico since the first diesel-powered Volkswagen Caribe in the late 70's and early 80's (see paragraphs for each maker: Honda and Volkswagen); still few carmakers have released their diesel-powered versions in the Mexican market due to stricter government emissions laws than those of the European Union Euro IV standard. This results in a petrol only car market in which drivers cannot reap the potential benefits of diesel automobiles. Diesel cars are not suited/permitted for every day driving in Mexico City; brand new diesel vehicles face the "Hoy no Circula" restrictions.

Current market (2007–present)

Mexican studio Mastretta Cars first announced the creation of their MXT through Automóvil Panamericano magazine in May 2007. The vehicle is the first Mexican sports car ever built, and features specifications similar to those of Lotus Elise and Porsche Cayman.
The production of MXT started in January 2011.

In 2010, Mexican bus maker Cimex announced that it was expanding into the passenger vehicle field and was developing a pickup truck called the Conin which would be Mexico's first domestic pickup truck when expected to enter production in 2013.

To date, 42 makers have official representation in the country with nearly 400 different models, making Mexico one of the most varied automotive markets in the world.

The automotive sector accounts for 17.6% of Mexico's manufacturing sector. Mexico is the second largest automobile manufacturing nation in the Western Hemisphere, after the United States, having produced 4 million vehicles in 2017. The industry produces technologically complex components and engages in research and development. The "Big Three" (General Motors, Ford and Chrysler) have been operating in Mexico since the 1930s, while Volkswagen and Nissan built their plants in the 1960s. In Puebla alone, 70 industrial part-makers cluster around Volkswagen. In the 2010s, expansion of the sector was surging. In 2014, more than $10 billion in investment was committed in the first few months of the year. Kia Motors in August 2014 announced plans for a $1 billion factory in Nuevo León. At the time, Mercedes-Benz and Nissan were already building a $1.4 billion plant near Aguascalientes, while BMW was planning a $1-billion assembly plant in San Luis Potosí. Additionally, Audi began building a $1.3 billion factory near Puebla in 2013. Of the Mexican car exports to the US, most are carried by rail, and some by sea.

Vehicle use restrictions
In Mexico City the "Hoy no circula" ("Cannot be driven today") program is implemented. Every vehicle has a color sticker depending on the ending number of its plate, as well as a number to determine its pollution rate. Brand new cars "00" and recent models "0" are exempt; "Hoy no circula" only applies to vehicles older than 8 years, which have "1" and "2" designations.
The program works by removing these vehicles from circulation one day during the week, and recently one Saturday per month, depending on their last license plate digit number.
Said limitations occur as follows:
 Plates ending with 5 or 6 (yellow) cannot be driven on Mondays and the 1st Saturday of the current month.
 Plates ending with 7 or 8 (pink) cannot be driven on Tuesdays and the 2nd Saturday of the current month.
 Plates ending with 3 or 4 (red) cannot be driven on Wednesdays and the 3rd Saturday of the current month.
 Plates ending with 1 or 2 (green) cannot be driven on Thursdays and the 4th Saturday of the current month.
 Plates ending with 9 or 0 (blue) cannot be driven on Fridays and the 5th Saturday (if any) of the current month.
For example, a fictional 1985 Volkswagen Golf with 903-NRX plates won't be allowed to be driven on Wednesdays, 18 September 2010, nor 16 October 2010, etc.
The newer weekends restrictions have received criticism. Only a few months a year have five Saturdays, and so the blue-stickered cars will be removed only four or five weekends a year from circulation, while the rest of the cars will be weekend-banned once every month.

Automotive culture and Mexico's auto show

Since the first "Autoexpo del Automóvil", the automotive culture in Mexico has been growing. The first Mexican auto magazines were published in November 1982 by Motor y Volante magazine, which became famous instantly for its irreverent criticism and professional performance testing of local versions of many cars.  After more than 10 years of being the sole specialty magazine, other publishers decided to jump on the bandwagon; in early 1995, 4 Ruedas Magazine, and shortly after, Automóvil Panamericano saw light. Technological advances have resulted in Motor y Volante remaining the sole digital auto magazine (by subscription only) but with an extremely large affiliation due to its 30 years of existence.
The Autoexpo changed denomination in 2004 to the "Salón Internacional del Automovil" to reflect its growth into an international size event. It is in fact an event comparable to the North American International Auto Show in Detroit. In the first two editions of Mexico's Auto Show, brands new to Mexico, like Mazda, were introduced. Jaguar and Volvo did not attend the 2004 or the 2005 editions. Renault would typically attend every two years. However, the 2006 edition of the auto show was considered a failure and a fraud since over 15 carmakers missed the event, including Volkswagen Group, Renault and Peugeot.
After the 2006 edition and for the first time since 1994, SIAM was not hosted the following year. A two-year event is currently hosted.

Successful cars in Mexico
Some cars have been especially successful in Mexico, depending on their cost and viability.

Chevrolet Corsa

The second-generation Opel Corsa (imported from Spain) was first introduced in Mexico in 1994 under the name "Chevrolet Chevy" as a response to the successful Volkswagen Sedán. General Motors used a practical, supermini with an affordable price tag for the Mexican consumer that gave excellent results. From 1996, when the Chevy Popular or Chevy Pop budget trim was introduced, and the Chevy began to be produced in the Ramos Arizpe GM assembly plant, it replaced the Volkswagen Sedan (Beetle) as the top selling car in Mexico. Chevrolet soon launched the also Mexican made Chevy Monza, similar to the 4-door saloon version of the Chevrolet Classic still produced in Argentina, for those who wanted a bigger trunk and more room for the same low price.

The design was not changed until 2000 when it was facelifted in Europe with transparent headlights, newer rear lights and a new interior. A station wagon imported from Argentina was also launched, as well as a Brazilian-made pickup variant. With the introduction of the Corsa III, however, the older Corsa was no longer manufactured in European GM plants. This generation Corsa remained in production in Mexico, Brazil and Argentina. In 2004, Mexican designers redesigned the Chevy inside and out and upgraded the 1.6-liter engine to reach 98 bhp. This newer Chevrolet was called C2 as a reference to the Corvette generations. In July 2008, a facelift designed in Detroit was introduced for the new 2009 Chevy, available in 3- and 5-door hatchback, and 4-door sedan bodies.

Nissan Tsuru

The Datsun 160J was a mid-size sedan that sold well but did not meet the sales number benchmark set by its successor.
In 1983 the first Nissan Sentra was launched as a replacement for the 160J under the name "Tsuru", Japanese for crane. While the Tsuru was quickly accepted by Mexicans as a comfortable and affordable car, it did not replace the VW Sedán as the top-selling car in Mexico.

A second-generation Tsuru was launched in late 1987 as a 1988 model with a more square-shaped and larger design. Neither generation, however, managed to become the best-selling car in Mexico.

The third generation Tsuru (the Sentra III) was introduced in November 1991. This Tsuru featured a more rounded 1990s type design scheme. Soon the third generation Tsuru was known for being powerful and comfortable, yet affordable.
With the new Chevrolet Chevy in 1994, however, the Tsuru had a new rival. It didn't take long for it to overtake the Chevy, and, soon after, the Sedán. It reached number 1 in 1998, and it stayed there until 2005, with the Volkswagen Pointer.
The Renault-based Nissan Platina was thought to be its successor, but the incredible sales ranking of the Tsuru kept the Platina as another option. The Platina remained in the top 10 until it was discontinued in 2010, alongside its hatchback counterpart, the Clio.

The Tsuru remains the most popular choice for city (but not for highway due to a lack of stability) taxi cab drivers in Mexico (airport and hotel taxis usually drive higher end vehicles, such as Audi), along with the MkIII. It is currently the longest-running car in terms of consecutive years sold in Mexico in the century (18 years), ended only by concerns over crash safety and emissions.

Volkswagen Jetta (Volkswagen Clásico from 2010 to 2015)

The first Jetta was renamed Atlantic for the Mexican market. It sold well, so Volkswagen decided to start manufacturing it in their factory at Puebla, Mexico.
In late 1998, the fourth generation Jetta (called Bora in Europe) reached Mexico. The car showed off a new design, which did not appeal initially to Mexicans. However, good marketing tactics and phrases like "No cambies, evoluciona" (Don't change, evolve) resulted in a quick change of opinion, and for the first time, a mid-sized vehicle made it into Mexico's top 10 sellers list; the Jetta became a hit and ranked as the fourth best-seller. The catch phrase "Todo mundo tiene un Jetta, al menos en la cabeza" (Everyone has a Jetta, at least in their mind) became a reality or so it seems as it is common to see many Jettas driving nearby on the streets.
The car's success was such that it was not replaced in 2005 by the Jetta V, which adopted the Bora moniker, so the Jetta IV continued to be offered for sale. Both cars achieved even greater success in their later years: Jetta IV placed number one for a month in June 2009, and Bora has stayed among the top five since 2008.
A redesigned Jetta was released in 2009 and advertised with a new slogan: "Porque el corazón no da explicaciones" (Because the heart gives no reasons).

On July 22, 2010, the sixth generation Jetta was released. As of August 2010, Mexico was the only country in the world where fourth, fifth and sixth generation Jettas were being sold at the same time. Bora left the dealerships in late 2010, but Jetta IV was still being offered afterwards due to its high sales. Incidentally, Volkswagen changed this version's moniker to simply Clásico (Spanish for "classic"). The Volkswagen Clásico sold very well until the 2015 model, which was the year it was discontinued, with the new Indian-built Vento taking its place.

Volkswagen Sedán

The first Volkswagen car sold in Mexico was the 1954 Beetle, called Sedán in this country. The popularity of the Beetle led VW to build their own factory in the state of Puebla, Mexico.
In the early 80s, Mexico and Brazil were the only countries producing the Beetle (Sedán in Mexico, Fusca in Brazil), so many foreign enthusiasts used to import the car and keep it as a collectible.
Brazil stopped producing the Fusca in 1997, and Mexico became the sole producer until 2003.

Volkswagen broadcast a minute-long farewell TV advertisement with people waving goodbye to the Sedán as it made its way through the avenue. On July 30, 2003 the last Beetle came out from the Puebla factory, closing a chapter in automobile history. The 3000th last edition Sedán was given to Pope John Paul II and now resides in the Volkswagen museum in Germany.

Companies with official brands in Mexico
This is a brief history of the car makers in this country.

Audi
Audi operates a car factory at San José Chiapa with a capacity of 150,000 units per year, including the Q5. Some parts are exported to China and India.

Aston Martin
Aston Martin entered the Mexican auto market in 2014 with the opening of their first dealership in Mexico City located in the Polanco neighborhood.

Bayerische Motoren Werke AG
Brands BMW and Mini.

See: BMW Mexico

Chrysler Group, LLC
Brands Chrysler, Dodge and Jeep; and vehicles by Hyundai (until 2014).
Chrysler entered Mexico around 1937. In the '60s, the company was renamed Automex. Then in the '70s, their name changed again to Chrysler de México. The latest models are launched just after those in the United States are launched.
Chrysler markets several brands including Dodge, Chrysler, Jeep, Smart, Maybach, and Mitsubishi (in partnership). They sold Hyundai passenger cars, cargo vans, and passenger vans under a "by Dodge" badge. This was because Hyundai had no official representation in Mexico until 2014. Strangely enough, the Dodge Ramcharger 2-door SUV was popular in the Mexican market. Chrysler even developed a version of the Ramcharger based on the 1994 Ram (not offered in the US) due to the popularity of 2-door SUV's in Mexico and the lack of market in the US.

For many years, Dodge vehicles were sometimes rebadged as Chryslers, for example, the Neon.

First Automobile Works
Brands FAW.

The first Chinese car maker in Mexico was introduced in January 2008 through the Elektra convenience stores, owned by Grupo Salinas. Although the F1 is the least expensive automobile in the country, FAW received very poor sales in comparison with popular brands such as GM, Volkswagen and Nissan. While some critics dismissed FAW due to its origin and the main purpose of offering an economy product, others supported it by showing videos recorded during the Euro NCAP tests for the F5. Its latest slogan was "impulsa tus sueños" (impulse your dreams), and it was marketed towards people unable to afford an expensive car. FAW initially planned to construct a factory in Mexico capable of producing over 100,000 vehicles annually; however, after the company saw the poor initial sales, they cancelled the plan. FAW has since left Mexico, but thanks to Great Wall Motors, it still is operating today under its commercial vehicle division.

Fiat S.p.A.
Brands Ferrari, Fiat and Maserati.
Fiat re-entered Mexico in 2004 in collaboration with General Motors, before its commercial rupture. Fiat hadn't achieved much sales success due to having only one model for sale until the beginning of 2006. Upon its introduction, the Punto was a hit for the carmaker.

Ferrari entered the country in 1998 with the F355 Spider. The Enzo Ferrari arrived in early 2004 at the former dealership at Avenida de los Insurgentes (now Alfa Romeo taking its place) in Mexico City with a price of $1,285,000 US dollars. Five units were sold. Furthermore, Ferrari chose Chiapas to test its F430 in 2004 before it came out. Curiously, they are the only carmaker to offer their entire catalogue in Mexico.

Ford Motor Company
Brands Ford, Lincoln, Mercury and Volvo.
Ford Motor Company México had excellent sales during the 1950s, '60s and '70s, before being overtaken by General Motors. It used to hold the second place in sales. For several decades, Ford sold various successful Mercury models under a Ford badge, most notoriously the Mercury Zephyr as the Ford Elite II (with a Ford Granada front end), Grand Marquis, Cougar, Topaz (an upmarket Ford Tempo) and Ghia (an upmarket Mercury Topaz).

From 1996, Lincoln dealerships became Lincoln-Mercury dealerships selling both brands.

For a time, the hot hatch Focus ST was the only hatchback Focus available in Mexico. It offers a 2.5i 5-cylinder engine like the European versions—Mexico being the only country in America in which Ford offers this European version (imported from Germany). Family versions were released with two trim levels and a 2.0i petrol engine.
This is not the same as the Focus sold in the United States, which is based on the original 1998–2005 version.

The European Ford Mondeo appeared in 2003, although it was different from the mainland Europe version; being more luxurious, it sold for approximately £20,000 for a 2.0i model.

Their successful Ikon (sedan version of the Fiesta II) remained a favourite for low income families, sharing similar success with the next generation model in 2005, the Fiesta III Sedan. However, it is the Brazilian EcoSport compact SUV which now holds the Ford's best seller title.

The latest Mustang remains a favourite with men in their 20s and 30s, as its previous generations did.

In 2010, the Taurus badge returned to Mexico after a 12-year absence, and was discontinued thereafter.

Ford has two factories in Mexico, producing around 400,000 cars per year at Hermosillo and Cuautitlán, mostly for export to US and Canada.

General Motors Company
Brands Buick, Cadillac, Chevrolet and GMC and vehicles by Opel and Holden.
General Motors was the sales leader in Mexico until 2009, when Nissan overtook GM. From the early '60s to the early '90s, Chevrolet was the only brand available, even in the '90s when GM sold Buicks and Oldsmobiles under the Chevrolet brand (e.g. the Buick Century as the Chevrolet Century Limited and the Oldsmobile Cutlass Ciera as the Chevrolet Cutlass and Chevrolet Eurosport). GMC models were also previously sold as Chevrolets in Mexico. Chevrolet was one of the first carmakers to establish itself in Mexico. The second formal GM brand to re-enter the market was Cadillac in 1991. Then more brands came throughout the decade. GM now markets several brands like Buick, Chevrolet, Cadillac and GMC.

The first Opel car in Mexico was the Rekord produced in the '60s. The carmaker retired from the country from 1972 until 1994, the year GM introduced the Opel Corsa under the name Chevrolet Chevy. Opel vehicles are currently sold under the Buick brand name in Mexico. The success of the Chevrolet Chevy (C2 redesigned in Mexico) kept GM ranked as the number one seller from 1995 until 2009.

GM introduced the Caprice and Lumina to the Mexican market again in the late 1990s, and turned massive profits off of those vehicles, where the Caprice is a popular taxi and police car. Chevrolet stopped importing the Lumina in 2013, which its slots were filled by the Malibu, Silverado (known in Cheyenne in this market), Camaro, and SS. The Caprice's slot was then filled by the Impala and Malibu in 2017.

GM introduced the previous Daewoo Matiz to Mexico under the name Pontiac Matiz, but shortly after Pontiac's discontinuation, the Matiz was sold under the Chevrolet logo in Europe. With the G3 and Aveo, GM offered the same model in Mexico as the Saturn models in the United States.

The Hummer H1 was available for the Mexican Army through the '90s. With the late 2007 scandal involving former president Vicente Fox (portraying him as the owner of diverse vehicles from unknown funds, notably a Hummer), jokes referring to the Hummer became popular throughout the country.
After the Pontiac brand stopped production of all cars in late 2010 as GM announced, Buick is expected to replace Pontiac in the Mexican market and become GMC's partner brand as most dealerships in Mexico are GMC-Pontiac.

Saab had a reputation similar to Volvo's. Both brands are respected for their safety concept and Swedish design. They left in 2010 due to Spyker buying out the firm, except for Volvo, which returned to the market a few years later after its absence.

The Cadillac Catera became a successful model in Mexico during the '90's. Nowadays the Escalade is the top selling Cadillac.

Honda Motor Company, Ltd.
Brands Acura and Honda.
HCL - Honda Celaya Plant

Hyundai Motor Company
Brands Hyundai and Kia.
Hyundai Motor México entered the Mexican market in 2014 with the Grand i10, Elantra, and the ix35. Soon afterwards, the Sonata joined the lineup. Prior to the introduction of the Hyundai brand for non-commercial vehicles, Hyundai passenger vehicles, light-duty cargo vans, and passenger vans were distributed by Chrysler de México, branded as Dodge.

Isuzu Motors, Ltd.
Isuzu Motors de México started operations in November 2005, thanks to the Economic Partnership Agreement that had been signed by Mexico and Japan. Isuzu is the first Japanese commercial vehicle manufacturer to enter Mexico, and it is a joint venture between Isuzu Motors Limited (51%) and Mitsubishi Corporation (49%). The company started sales with the ELF in 3 different versions: ELF 300 with payload capacity of 3.4 tons, ELF 400 with a 4-ton payload and ELF 450 with a 4.5 ton capacity. Since then the brand has expanded throughout the country, as of 2008 has 27 dealers and will start assembly operations for the model ELF 600 in 2009. 

GM Mexico sold an Isuzu pick-up truck as the Chevrolet Luv, imported from Chile (GM Chile). There was a Single Cab and a Crew Cab 4x2 model with a 2.3 cc Petrol engine. It was the first South American compact truck (before the Ford Ranger and Toyota Hilux from Argentina).

Jaguar Land Rover
Brands Jaguar Cars and Land Rover.
The X-Type is the most successful Jaguar in the country with a price of US$40,000. Less than 1000 Jaguars are sold per year however as the company has faced stiff competition from Mercedes Benz and BMW, which have domestic manufacturing facilities in Mexico.
The SUV maker Land Rover is very popular among the middle and high classes in Mexico. The LR3 and the Freelander are the most successful models.

Mazda Motor Corporation
Mazda was introduced in Mexico in November 2005 with the release of the then current Mazda3 and Mazda6 models.

While it was common to spot imported B2000 pick-ups and 626 sedans on the streets, Mazda vehicles were virtually unknown in Mexico. When the Mazda3 was introduced, both hatchback and notchback versions became a success among youngsters.

Throughout 2007 and 2008, Mazda fulfilled most of its clients' requests by presenting the MPV Mazda5, the SUVs CX-7 and CX-9, and the popular roadster, the Miata, rebadged MX-5. Though the coupé, the RX-8, had been considered, the modifications needed to achieve good performance in the Valley of Mexico led to the idea being dropped. The only RX-8 delivered by Mazda Motor de México to an individual was raffled by Mazda itself in 2008.

The new generation Mazda3 and the CX-7 have kept Mazda among the most successful brands in Mexico; Mazda6 and MX-5 maintain regular sales, while Mazda5 and CX-9 have the weakest.

McLaren Automotive
McLaren Automotive entered the Mexican market in 2015 by opening its first dealership in the capital city Mexico City (Santa Fe). One year later they opened a second dealership in León, Guanajuato to serve León and the rest of the bajio region.

Mercedes-Benz

See: Mercedes-Benz Mexico

PSA Peugeot Citroën
Brands Peugeot, Opel and a vehicle by Citroën.
Peugeot returned to Mexico in 1997 with the 306 Saloon. The 206 has had very good sales despite having the Renault Clio as a tough competitor. Peugeots rank high in sales mostly because of their design.

Renault–Nissan–Mitsubishi Alliance (Renault S.A., Mitsubishi Motors and Nissan Motor Company, Ltd.)
Brands Nissan, Mitsubishi and Renault, and vehicles by Dacia, Infiniti and Samsung.
Nissan is a well-known carmaker in Mexico and number one in sales thanks largely to its model Tsuru II, based on the 1991–94 Sentra and being facelifted every four years. The Tsuru III's driveline currently uses Renault-sourced parts, which are locally manufactured. This car is especially prized by taxicab companies for being affordable (around $131,000 MXN or $9500 USD), strong, spacious, fast and trustworthy. This has kept it in the number one sales position since the 90s, and that has kept Nissan at the top of the sales rankings in the country. With the Renault-Nissan Alliance, Nissan México designed the Platina, based on the Renault Clio Symbol. The Platina was an option for Mexican families who wanted more space for a smaller price. Nissan Mexicana sold the Dacia Logan (made by Renault Brazil) as the Nissan Aprio.
Nissan also sells one Infiniti model.

First established in 1959, Renault was quite successful in Mexico during the late 70s and early 80s with their R5 (nicknamed "zapatito" or "little shoe") and R12. The French pronunciation of the marque was mis-conceived as "Reh-nol", "Roh-nol" and even "Roh-ñol". Renault's Mexican assembly was carried out by DINA S.A. Renault remained successful until 1986 when it left the country because of financial reasons.

Following in the footsteps of Peugeot, Renault returned to Mexico in late 1999 via the Mexican Auto Show (then Autoexpo) of 1999, where they offered the first generation Mégane Scénic's (or simply Scénic) for test-drives — a model seen for the first time at the Auto Show. This vehicle, known for being the first mid-size MPV, was introduced in 2000 and was received warmly by the Mexican buyers. The small family sedan Mégane followed the next year, along with their best seller Clio's sporty version, the Clio II Renault Sport. Regarding the success of the hot hatch, Renault decided to present for sale in Mexico their Mexican-made Clio II, featuring the 2001 restyling (though the 1998 type original dashboard remained), dark gray rims and a unique 1.6i—mounted on other Renaults in order to resist Mexico's central states' heights. The Nissan factory in Aguascalientes was used for the assembly of the Clio, the Platina (Nissan's Clio sedan version) and, formerly, the previous Scénic. The facelifted Clio was introduced in late 2006 featuring a new front and rear end and new interior design (from the European 2001 version). It was planned for it to remain on sale, as in most countries, until 2010. Ironically, the Clio outlasted this new Clio II's presence on the Mexican market. It is now one of the two remaining French Renault models, since the Mégane II hatch production ended in Spain. Korean Koleos, Safrane, and Fluence, and the Colombian Sandero were expected to replace all French models by 2012.

Mitsubishi entered Mexico in 2003 with the previous Galant and Montero. Mitsubishi has had success with the SUVs Endeavor and Outlander, and, recently with the Lancer.

Subaru
Arrived to Mexico in 2006, through an importer, and by 2017 Subaru arrived officially as a brand to Mexico opening Corporative offices in Mexico City

Suzuki Motor Corporation
Suzuki came to Mexico in 2005 thanks to the free trade agreement between Japan and Mexico in October of that year. The first dealer began by selling two models: Model year 2006 Grand Vitara V6 and the four-door Aerio. The current dealer network consists of 40 agencies spanning the length and breadth of the country. The Grand Vitara is still doing great and inspired Suzuki to import the Swift, which has also been a successful model. As of 2012, Suzuki of México offered a total of five products with many different options: Swift GL MT, GLS MT & GLS AT, SX4 Crossover MT & CVT, SX4 Sedán MT & CVT, Kizashi CVT and Grand Vitara GL AT, Grand Vitara HIMALAYA AT, GLS AT & 4X4 AT.

Toyota Motor Corporation
Toyota officially entered Mexico in early 2002 with the Camry and Corolla. The carmaker was already known in the country for the pick-ups and cars imported from the United States before it officially entered Mexico. The Tacoma is built in manufacturing plants in Tecate, Tijuana, Baja California, Mexico and San Antonio, Texas, U.S.A. The Corolla and the RAV4 are very successful in Mexico as in the rest of the world.

Volkswagen Group
Brands Audi, Bentley, Lamborghini, SEAT, Porsche and Volkswagen.
Volkswagen is a sales leader in Mexico, just behind Nissan and GM. The commercial success of the Pointer, Jetta and Lupo models have helped Volkswagen's sales. Volkswagen hasn't introduced the ultra-luxury brand Bugatti in Mexico (which may only be bought through specialist car dealers in major cities such as Mexico City with reports of at least 2 Bugatti being imported from the US), however, even though Audi and Bentley are selling well in Mexico, they are not as common as VW due to the fact they are more expensive. Lamborghini de Mexico officially entered the Mexican car market in 2010 with the opening of a dealership in Mexico City.

Audis are very popular amongst Mexican youths and business people. The most successful models are the A4 sedan and the A3 Sportback.

The Spanish carmaker SEAT arrived in Mexico in 2001 with the Ibiza. The brand has been very successful with the strong sellers being the Ibiza  and the León (new 1.4 and 1.8 TSi variants have been recently introduced). The Seat Córdoba will be produced starting next year in the Volkswagen assembly plant in Puebla, as the 2.0 Tiptronic variant.

Volkswagen was introduced in Mexico in 1954 with the offering of the popular Beetle. A major investor in the Volkswagen de Mexico dealership was Prince Alfonso of Hohenlohe-Langenburg. The Type 1 was officially called Sedán and commonly called "Vocho" as an abbreviation of Volkswagen.

Volkswagen recently introduced the Jetta TDi with a 1.9 Diesel engine. It is the second diesel-engineered car in Mexico since the Volkswagen Caribe Diesel (1979–1983), which was slow-selling in this country. Unfortunately the sales of the Jetta TDi (unlike the huge number of sales of the 2.0i edition) have been small, encouraging its end in this country. VW is trying to convince government and environmental authorities of the advantages of using diesel and to encourage the reduction of taxes and other stimuli to increase the sales of the TDi.

VW has factories in Cuautlancingo (in Puebla) and Silao, and uses rail, trucks and the ports of Veracruz and Lázaro Cárdenas for imports and exports.

Porsche is also sold in Mexico although it is supplied directly by Porsche and not through VW due to the fact Porsche was once an independent company before it was bought by VW and VW has not yet merged the two supply chains.

Mainstream carmakers

Notes:
If a car's retiring year reads 2021 and its availability cell is coloured green, it means no more units will be produced nor imported, but the last units are still on sale.
If a car has no retiring year marked but its availability cell is coloured red, it means either that car is in the middle of a restyling or the maker is waiting for new units to arrive.
No future dates shall be given.
Family, executive and leisure cars are found below in the following Mexican body configurations: microauto (microcar), auto de ciudad (city car), subcompacto (supermini), compacto (small family car), mediano (large family car), lujo (executive car), miniván (MPV by size), SUV (by size), pick-up (by size), van (small LAV), van mediana (light van), and van larga (van). Sport cars are found on the lower part of each table following the same format and including (if any): roadster and coupé. Convertibles may not be considered sport cars.
 Blue link/text indicates a car whose brand and name are/were the same as the original model.
 Green link/text indicates a car whose name is/was different from its original market.
 Gamboge link/text indicates a car whose brand is/was different from its original market.
 Dark red link/text indicates a car whose brand and name are/were different from its original market.

Acura

Alfa Romeo

Current
Giulia
Stelvio

Discontinued
8C Competizione (by special order only)
147
159
GT
Brera
Giulietta (2011-2020)

Audi (1997–present)

Bentley (2008–present)

BMW (1997–present)
1 Series The 120i and 130i are available in 3- and 5-door Hatchback, 125i and 135i are available as Coupé. The 1 series Convertible is scheduled to be introduced next December
3 Series The 325i and 335i are available as Sedan, Coupé and Convertible
5 Series The 525i, 530i, and 550i are available only as Sedan
6 Series The 650i is available as Coupé and Convertible
7 Series The 750i is available in short- and long-wheelbase bodies, while the 760i is available only as a long-wheelbase sedan
M3 Available as Sedan and Coupé
M5 Available as Sedan only
M6 Available as Coupé and Convertible
X3 2.5 and 3.0 variants are available
X5 3.0 and 4.8 variants are available as 5 or 7-seater SUV
X6 3.0i, 4.8i
Z4; 2.0i, 3.0i
Z4 M Coupé

Cadillac (1991–present)

Current 

 Escalade (2001–present)
 XT6 (2019–present)
 XT5 (2016–present)
 XT4 (2019–present)

Discontinued 
BLS
CTS
STS
SRX
XLR

Chevrolet (1923–present)

Captiva
Uplander
Traverse
Tahoe (marketed as Chevrolet Sonora prior to 2006)
Suburban
Tornado (Corsa MkIII Pick-up version)
Colorado
Silverado
Avalanche

Chrysler (1929–present)
PT Cruiser
Cirrus III
300C
Town & Country
Aspen

Dodge (1928–present)

Atos
Attitude
Caliber
Avenger
Journey
Durango
Nitro
Dakota
Ram
H100

Charger; Daytona, SRT-8
Challenger; V6, SRT-8
Viper; SRT-10
Vision

FAW (2008–2010)

Ferrari (1998–present)

Fiat (2005–present)

Panda (2008–present)
500 (2009–present)
Idea; Adventure
Palio; HB, Adventure
Albea (2008–present)
Grande Punto III (2007–present)
Strada
Ducato

Stilo (2007); Schumacher (++)

Ford (1925–present)

Fusion
Ecosport
Escape II
Edge
Explorer
Excursion (2000–2005)
Expedition
Courier
Ranger  General Pacheco, Buenos Aires
F-Series; F-150, F-250 (Both models are F-150 Mod 1997–2002) Just Single cab, F-150 4X2 V6 PETROL AND F-250 V8 PETROL 4X2 OR 4X4
Explorer Sport Trac
Lobo
Transit
Fiesta III ST
Focus II ST
Mustang VI; V6, GT, Shelby GT500
Figo

GMC
Canyon
Yukon
Yukon Denali
Sierra
Acadia

Honda (1995–present)

Ridgeline
Civic

Hummer (2006–2010)
H2; SUV, SUT
H3

Hyundai (2014–present)
Grand i10
Grand Starex
Elantra
Sonata
Santa Fe
Tucson
Accent
Creta

Isuzu
Elf

Jaguar
X-Type
XF
XJ
XK

Jeep (1994–present)

Current 
Patriot
Compass
Renegade
Wrangler
Grand Cherokee
Gladiator

Discontinued 
Liberty
Commander

Kia (2015–present)
Bongo
Forte
Optima
Rio
Sorento
Soul
Sportage
Stinger GT
Sedona

Lamborghini (2010–present)

Land Rover
LR3
LR2
Range Rover
Range Rover Sport

Lincoln (1991–present)
The Navigator is Lincoln's most popular and successful car in Mexico.
MKZ
MKX
MKS
Navigator
Mark LT

Maserati (1998–present)

Quattroporte

GranTurismo

Mastretta (1989–present)

Mazda (2005–present)

Mercedes-Benz (1984–present)
A-Class Hatchback - Juiz de Fora, Brazil 
B-Class Sports Tourer/Hatchback - Juiz de Fora, Brazil 
C-Class Sedan, Sports Coupe & Wagon - Santiago Tianguistenco, Mexico 
CL-Class Coupe - Santiago Tianguistenco, Mexico 
CLK-Class Coupe & Cabriolet - Monterrey, Mexico 
CLS-Class "4 Door Coupe" - Santiago Tianguistenco, Mexico 
CLC-Class luxury compact car - Juiz de Fora, Brazil 
E-Class Sedan & Wagon - Santiago Tianguistenco, Mexico 
G-Class Cross-country vehicle - Santiago Tianguistenco, Mexico 
GL-Class SUV - Santiago Tianguistenco, Mexico 
M-Class SUV - Tuscaloosa, Alabama, United States 
R-Class Sports Tourer - Mexico City, Mexico 
S-Class luxury sedan - Santiago Tianguistenco, Mexico 
SL-Class Roadster - Santiago Tianguistenco, Mexico 
SLK-Class Roadster - Mexico City, Mexico 
Sprinter Van Mexico City, Mexico , Santiago Tianguistenco, Mexico , and Monterrey, Mexico

Mercury (1994–2011)

- MG (2020–present)
 5
 ZS
 HS

MINI (2002–present)

Mitsubishi (2003–present)

Lancer X Just Petrol, 5-speed Manual or CVT, 3 trim levels: DE, ES, GTS.
GTS is only offered with CVT transmission, unlike US versions. Similar to European version
Galant IX
Grandis Just Petrol, 4-speed Automatic
Montero Just Petrol, Automatic, 4wd, Limited Level. (5 doors) Imported from Japan
Montero Sport Just Petrol, Automatic, 4wd. (5 doors) Imported from Thailand
Endeavor
Outlander II
L200 L200 Petrol or Diesel, Just Crew Cab, 4x2 or 4x4

Lancer Evolution IX (++)
Eclipse IV; Coupé, Cabrio, 3.8L V6 only, Automatic only.
L300; Coachvan Only

Nissan (1984–present)

Altima IV CVT only, no Manual offered.
Maxima VII
Quest III
Rogue
X-Trail II CVT only, Petrol Only.
Murano II
Pathfinder III
Titan
Urvan
370Z Manual or Auto, Rear fog light unlike US versions.
GT-R R35

Peugeot (1958–1962; 1997–present)
Partner; Grand Raid
Expert; Tepee
Manager

Pontiac (1994–2010)

Matiz G2 (++) 
G3
G5
G6
Torrent

G6; GXP (++)
Solstice; Roadster, GXP

Porsche (1995–present)

Cayenne Tiptronic Only, Petrol only.
Cayenne GTS Tiptronic Only.

Radical

Renault (1963–1986; 2000–present)

Saab
9-3
9-5

SEAT (2001–present)

Altea XL
Freetrack
León Cupra R

Smart (2001–present)

Subaru (2017–present)
Crosstrek Presented as XV
Forester
BRZ
WRX_STI

Suzuki (2005–present)

Toyota (2002–present) 
Yaris
Yaris Sedan
Yaris R
Corolla (Available as a 4-door sedan only. The basic Base model, upmarket LE and SE trims come from Mississippi, U.S.A.)
Matrix
Camry Automatic Only.
Highlander
Sequoia
Innova
Avanza
Hiace Just Petrol
Hilux Just Single Cab and Double Cab, 2.7 cc Petrol, 5-speed manual, 4x2 only Imported from Thailand.
Tacoma Just Crew Cab, 4.0 cc Petrol, 5-speed automatic, 4x2 only Made in Mexico.
Tundra
RAV4 Petrol Only, Automatic Only.
Sienna
Land Cruiser
Supra

Volkswagen (1954–present)

 Amarok (Imported from Argentina).
Eurovan (T5 Transporter cargo and passenger van w/long wheelbase. Only sold with the 1.9TDi/105 hp engine)
 Jetta IV; 2.0i, 1.9TDi
 Beetle(Sold as GLS with 2.0 115 hp engine, Sport, Cabriolet and Sport GLX trims with 5 cil. 2.5 lt 170 hp engine. All variants with 5-speed manual and 6-speed tiptronic gearboxes)
Routan
 Passat (It is sold with 2.0 TFSi 200 hp, and V6 3.6 280 hp engines with 6-speed Tiptronic gearbox, the latter one is available also as a 4Motion model. Imported from Germany)
Tiguan
 Touareg; V6, V8 Petrol, V6 TDI.
Crafter
 Jetta GLI; 1.8T
GLI; 2.0 TFSi/DSG

Volvo

Current 
XC40
XC60
XC90
S60
S40

Discontinued 
C30
S40 AWD 2,5T Only with Automatic Transmission,2,4L FWD Manual.
S80
V50
C70

Vuhl
VUHL 05

Missing makers
Few are the mainstream makers that have not official representation in Mexico but all of their models can be imported through exotic car dealers located mostly in Mexico City, Puebla, Veracruz, Mérida, Monterrey and Guadalajara.

Citroën
Some people have begun to import C4 models to Mexican streets. There is a small unofficial importer in the Interlomas section in Mexico State just bordering Mexico City. The French maker has not made an official announcement or pointed out plans for entering the Mexican market in the near future, and remains one of the few countries in the world (along with the United States and Canada) where Citroën cars are not available.

Lancia
Lancia models were presented at the 2003 Mexican Autoshow, though dealerships have not yet opened in the country. The next generation Delta however and Lancia's opening for new Latin American markets gives a wide possibility the maker will be selling by 2009.

Lexus
After many false rumours in more than one decade, an official entry programmed for the final quarter of 2021, in September 2021, with vehicles of the 2022 model year. The reason for this is to allow Lexus apply a marketing strategy and have time to make necessary adjustments to suspension and motor to all of its vehicles, to offer characteristic comfort of the brand in Mexico. The confirmed models for Mexico are the Lexus LS500h (hybrid), along with the ES, RX, LX, and UX, all of these models will be additionally offered in hybrid versions, as Lexus will find the most "green" lineup in the luxury segment in Mexico to offer all of its models with a hybrid variant. Once the brand arrives to Mexico, five agencies in Mexico City, Guadalajara, and Monterrey will be opened, and the agencies will focus on creating a purchase experience to all of their clients. However, the sport F range of cars is not confirmed, but there will be plans to launch it. Finally, in late 2021, a factory plant will begin to operate in Guanajuato, where the Toyota Tacoma is built. In addition, the Lexus brand will be an independent division which will get help from Toyota de Mexico, and additional help from TMNA and Lexus USA (its home market).

Maybach
57
62

Rolls-Royce
The Phantom is the only model available at the moment, it has a cost of $415,000 US dollars. However it is known that several varieties of Rolls-Royces are owned throughout the country, these were individually imported.
Phantom

Saleen
Saleen has no official subsidiary in Mexico, but they are imported through an official representative importer.
S7

Scion
Toyota's youth line has not been introduced to the Mexican market. So far, there are no dates announced, even after the brand's discontinuation in 2016.

Škoda
Volkswagen and certain European car distributors import Skodas, but with the process, this economy line turns out to be more expensive than other higher end cars, making its purchase unattractive.

See also 
 Manufacturing in Mexico
 Latin American economy

Further reading
Bennett, Douglas and Kenneth Evan Sharpe.  Transitional Corporations Versus the State: The Political Economy of the Mexican Auto Industry. Princeton: Princeton University Press 1985.
Bennett, Mark. Public Policy and Industrial Development: The Case of the Mexican Auto-Parts Industry. Boulder: Westview Press 1986.
Jenkins, Rhys Owen. Dependent Industrialization in Latin America: The Automotive Industry in Argentina, Chile, and Mexico. New York: Praeger 1977.
Moreno Brid, Juan Carlos. Mexico's Motorvehicle Industry in the 1980s. Geneva: International Labor Office 1988.
Shaiken, Harley. Automation and Global Production: Automobile Engine Production in Mexico, the United States, and Canada. LaJolla, CA: Center for U.S.-Mexican Studies 1987.
Fernando "Ferdle" Sanchez. Mexico's secondary advisor over the Motorcar industry in Chilpancingo, Mérida, and Guadalajara. The Los Angeles Council of Elders.

References

Sources

 Automóvil Panamericano. Mexican magazine (issues from October 1996 to October 2006). Retrieved August 18, 2006.
 4 Ruedas Magazine. Mexican Magazine (issues from October 1996 to September 2006). retrieved August 18, 2006.